This is a list of mayors of San Juan, Puerto Rico.

List of mayors of San Juan

Under the Commonwealth of Puerto Rico 
 (6) 
 (5)

See also

 San Juan City Hall
San Juan government
 Timeline of San Juan, Puerto Rico

References

San Juan, Puerto Rico
mayors